Pambio Noranco is a quarter of the city of Lugano, Switzerland. 

Pambio Noranco was formerly a municipality of its own, having been incorporated into Lugano in 2004.

Villages
 Noranco
 Pambio

References

External links
 
 Official Pambio Noranco quarter website

Districts of Lugano
Former municipalities of Ticino